Clark Farm Complex is a historic home and farm complex located at Lima in Livingston County, New York. It is a large working farm composed of a mid-19th century farmhouse and full complex of farm related support structures.  The farmhouse was constructed in the early 1830s.  There are twelve related farm dependencies dating from the mid-19th century to early 20th century.  They include a well house, smoke house, privy, garage, and chicken house.

It was listed on the National Register of Historic Places in 1989.

References

Houses on the National Register of Historic Places in New York (state)
Federal architecture in New York (state)
Houses in Livingston County, New York
National Register of Historic Places in Livingston County, New York